Kissing the Coronavirus is a 2020 romance novelette written by Robert Winters under the pseudonym M.J. Edwards. The book was published by Viral erotica.

Background 
The book was authored by an anonymous author under the pen name M.J. Edwards after she lost her job during the COVID-19 pandemic.

Synopsis 
The book centers around a romance between Alexa Ashingtonford, a researcher tasked with curing the coronavirus, and an anthropomorphized version of the COVID-19 virus.

Reception 
The 35-page-book had a mixed reception due to its premise and writing, which garnered both criticism for its quality and praise for its unintentionally comedic tone. CBR called the book "a masterwork of bad erotica." Dhvani Solani of Vice criticized the novelette's writing, saying "the only place the book is going to is the Bad Sex in Fiction awards." Cassandra Stone of Scary Mommy was similarly negative, saying the book was "as insane as it sounds."

In December 2020, a sequel titled Kissing the Coronavirus 2: The Second Wave was published. Since then numerous sequels have appeared, grouped under the series title Kissing the Coronavirus Chronicles. In April 2021 episodes 1–3 appeared in the anthology Kissing the Coronavirus Chronicles plus an additional unpublished story titled Kissing the Coronavirus: The Legend of Doctor Ashingtonford.

Kissing the Coronavirus Chronicles 
 (2020) Kissing the Coronavirus. Episode 1. .
 (2020) Kissing the Coronavirus 2: The Second Wave. Episode 2. .
 (2021) Kissing the Coronavirus 3: The Mutant Strain. Episode 3. .
 (2021) Kissing the Coronavirus Chronicles. Episodes 1–3 plus Kissing the Coronavirus: The Legend of Doctor Ashingtonford. .
 (2021) Covid Claus is Coming to Town. Episode 4. .

References 

Books about the COVID-19 pandemic
2020 debut novels
English novels
Novels set in the 21st century
Novelettes
Contemporary romance novels
Erotic romance novels